Lushoto is one of the eleven districts of Tanga Region in Tanzania. It is bordered to the northeast by Kenya, to the east by the Muheza District, to the northwest by the Kilimanjaro Region, west by Korogwe District and to the south by the Bumbuli District. The district's capital and largest town is Lushoto.

History
It was formerly known as Wilhelmstal (William's Valley) and was named after Emperor Wilhelm II.

During the German colonial period from the 1890s to 1918 the area was popular with settlers, hence the German place name of Wilhelmstal. Large farms and plantations were created, and the district was valued for its pleasant mountain climate. Numerous church missions were, and remain, active.

The initial plan of the Usambarabahn was to connect the port of Tanga with Lake Victoria by passing south of the Usambara Mountains. This was in direct competition with parallel British efforts in colonial Kenya. From 4 June 1912 to 12 May 1913 the line was renamed Nordbahn (Northern Railway).

According to the 2002 Tanzania National Census, the population of the Lushoto District was 419,970. By 2012, the population had increased to 492,441.
In 2016, Lushoto district was separated from Bumbuli District there to population of Lushot as of 2012 was 332,436.

Administrative subdivisions

Wards
As of 2012, Lushoto District is administratively divided into 28 wards:

Gallery

References

External links

 Lushoto District Homepage for the 2002 Tanzania National Census
Lushoto District Website

Districts of Tanga Region